The Battle of Kasur took place in 1807 between the Sikh Empire and the Afghans and was part of the Afghan-Sikh Wars. The battle was the first significant Sikh victory over the ruler of Kasur.

Battle

The battle of Kasur was led by Maharaja Ranjit Singh and Jodh Singh Ramgarhia as Kasur had been a long thorn in the side of Ranjit Singh's power because of its proximity to his capital city of Lahore. The battle was also Hari Singh's first significant participation in a Sikh conquest by assuming charge of an independent contingent in 1807, in which the Muslim army surrendered and many of them were put to the sword while many others were taken as prisoners of War.   During the campaign, Hari Singh Nalwa showed remarkable bravery and dexterity. and as a result, was granted a Jagir in recognition of his services.

Aftermath
Kasur was annexed into Sikh Empire.

References

Sources
 
 
 

Sikh Empire
Kasur District